Semi-Conducted is a live album by the Canadian comedy music group The Arrogant Worms, recorded on January 22, 2002, and backed by the Edmonton Symphony Orchestra.  It was released the following year.  Actual footage of the show was recorded and aired on a (heavily cut-down) TV special called Three Worms and an Orchestra, which was later released on DVD (containing the original show without TV edits, plus two music videos).  The CD itself contains most of the songs from the show, but omits most of the banter in between songs, as well as performances of "Mounted Animal Nature Trail", "Proud To Be A Banker", and the encore "Jesus' Brother Bob".

Track listing
 "Overture"
 "Big Fat Road Manager"
 "Canada's Really Big"
 "Rocks and Trees"
 "Log In to You"
 "I am Cow"
 "Last Saskatchewan Pirate"
 "Gaelic Song"
 "Me Like Hockey"
 "Carrot Juice is Murder"
 "Dangerous"
 "Billy the Theme Park Shark"
 "Celine Dion"
 "We are the Beaver"

The Arrogant Worms albums
2003 live albums